Rotvoll is a railway station on the Nordland Line at Rotvoll in Trondheim, Norway. It is served by the Trøndelag Commuter Rail operated by SJ Norge with hourly service to Trondheim and Steinkjer.

The station is located beside the Equinor offices at Rotvoll. Bus connections are also available with AtB.

Railway stations on the Nordland Line
Railway stations in Trondheim
Railway stations opened in 1909
1909 establishments in Norway